Fort Curtis may refer to:
 Fort Curtis (Missouri), a former Union Army installation near Ironton, Missouri
 Fort Curtis (Arkansas), a former Union Army installation in Helena, Arkansas